John Sandy is a former chair of the Idaho Republican Party and Idaho State Senator serving District 22.

Personal life, education and career 
Sandy has a bachelor of science degree from the University of Idaho, and has owned livestock businesses and a small hydroelectric project.

John and his wife Robin have 1 child.

Political career 
Sandy was chair of the University of Idaho College Republicans during the 1960s and later served as Vice Chairman of Idaho Republican Party. He was appointed by Governor Phil Batt to serve District 22 in  the Idaho Senate in 1995. He won election for his first full term in 1996, and was re-elected in 1998 and 2000. He served his assistant majority leader of the state Senate from 1996 - 2002.

Sandy was Chief of Staff during Jim Risch's seven-month tenure as Governor in 2006, and headed Risch's transition team after the Risch was elected to the U.S. Senate in 2006, later also serving as his chief of staff, till 2019.

Sandy was unopposed for chair of the Idaho Republican Party in 2002. He chose not to run for reelection as state chair in 2004.

Sandy was an elector for George W. Bush for Idaho in 2004.

Elections

References 

Living people
Idaho Republicans
1948 births
University of Idaho alumni
People from Twin Falls, Idaho